Stephen C. Bowers served in the California legislature and during the American Civil War he served in the Army of the Confederate States of America.

References

Confederate States Army personnel
Members of the California State Legislature
Year of birth missing
Year of death missing